The 2007 Countrywide Classic was a men's tennis tournament played on outdoor hard courts at the Los Angeles Tennis Center in Los Angeles, California in the United States and was part of the International Series of the 2007 ATP Tour and of the 2007 US Open Series. It was the 81st edition of the Los Angeles Open and the tournament ran from July 16, 2007 through July 23, 2007. Unseeded Radek Štěpánek won his first title of the year, and second career title.

Finals

Singles

 Radek Štěpánek defeated  James Blake, 7–6(9–7), 5–7, 6–2

Doubles

 Bob Bryan /  Mike Bryan defeated  Scott Lipsky /  David Martin, 7–6(7–5), 6–2

References